The 2021–22 season was Juventus Football Club's 124th season in existence and the club's 15th consecutive season in the top flight of Italian football. In addition to the domestic league, Juventus participated in this season's edition of the Coppa Italia, the Supercoppa Italiana, and the UEFA Champions League.

Juventus finished the season trophyless for the first time since 2010–11.

Season summary

Pre-season 
On 11 May 2021, Gianluigi Buffon announced that he would leave Juventus at end of the previous season. On 28 May, Andrea Pirlo was sacked and Massimiliano Allegri was chosen in his place as team's coach. On 15 June, Juventus announced that Álvaro Morata's loan had been renewed.

July 
On 24 July, Juventus played a friendly match against Serie C side Cesena, winning 3–1, through goals scored by Koni De Winter, Weston McKennie, and Matías Soulé. On 31 July, Juventus won their 11th Trofeo Luigi Berlusconi, winning 2–1 against Serie B side Monza at Stadio Brianteo through goals scored by Filippo Ranocchia in the 13th minute and Dejan Kulusevski in the 53rd minute.

August 
On 2 August, Juventus announced that Giorgio Chiellini's contract had been renewed. On 8 August, Juventus played the Joan Gamper Trophy against Spanish La Liga side Barcelona at Johan Cruyff Stadium, losing 3–0. On 14 August, Juventus played a friendly match against Serie A side Atalanta, winning 3–1, thanks to goals scored by Paulo Dybala, Federico Bernardeschi, and Álvaro Morata. On 17 August, Juventus announced that Kaio Jorge's purchase had been officialised from Brazilian Série A side Santos. On 18 August, Juventus announced that Manuel Locatelli's purchase had been officialised from Serie A side Sassuolo. On 19 August, Juventus played the last pre-season friendly match against Serie C side Juventus U23, winning 3–0, through goals scored by Dybala, Morata, and Aaron Ramsey.

On 22 August, Juventus made their official season debut, drawing 2–2 against Udinese. Dybala scored after three minutes to the start and Juan Cuadrado doubled the result in the 23rd minute. In the 51st minute, the referee awarded a penalty kick after Juventus' goalkeeper Wojciech Szczęsny fouled Tolgay Arslan; Roberto Pereyra scored from the spot reducing the disadvantage. In the 83rd minute, Stefano Okaka scored the equalizing goal due to a Szczęsny mistake. On 28 August, Juventus lost 1–0 against Empoli in the second matchday due to a Leonardo Mancuso's goal in the 21st minute. On 31 August, Juventus announced that Cristiano Ronaldo had been sold to English Premier League side Manchester United, as well as Moise Kean's purchase from another English side, Everton.

September 
On 14 September, Juventus made their debut in UEFA Champions League against Swedish side Malmö FF, winning 0–3. The match resulted in being the first season victory: in the 23rd minute, Alex Sandro scored the opening goal through a header from a Juan Cuadrado's cross; in the 45th minute, the captain Paulo Dybala scored his penalty caused by a foul on Álvaro Morata; one minute later, in the additional time, again Morata scored the third overall goal.

October 
On 2 October, Juventus played the Derby della Mole against Torino side, winning 0–1. Manuel Locatelli scored the only goal late in the second half. The same result was achieved against Roma on 17 October; Moise Kean scored in the 16th minute.

On 24 October, Juventus played the Derby d'Italia against Internazionale, drawing 1–1: Paulo Dybala equalised the score on penalty late in the second half, after the first goal scored by Edin Džeko in the first period.

November 
On 2 November, Juventus qualified to the knockout phase of the UEFA Champions League thanks to the 4–2 win against Russian side Zenit Saint Petersburg. Paulo Dybala scored twice, including a penalty, followed by other two goals scored by Federico Chiesa and Álvaro Morata, respectively. Zenit Saint Petersburg's goals were provided by Leonardo Bonucci's own goal and Sardar Azmoun.

December 
On 8 December, Juventus achieved first position in the group stage of the UEFA Champions League with 15 points. Home win 1–0 against Malmö FF with the only goal scored by Moise Kean in the 18th minute and 3–3 between Zenit Saint Petersburg and Chelsea meant Juventus was seeded in the knockout phase round of 16 draw.

January 
On 6 January, as the championship returned for its second leg, Juventus drew 1–1 against Napoli. Dries Mertens scored in the first half; his goal was equalized by Federico Chiesa in the second period. On 9 January, Juventus went against Roma, achieving a 4–3 comeback. In the first half, Tammy Abraham scored for Roma, followed by a Paulo Dybala's goal. In the second period, Henrikh Mkhitaryan put Roma in front, with Lorenzo Pellegrini scoring the third goal for the home team. In less than eights minutes, Juventus scored three times: Manuel Locatelli, Dejan Kulusevski and Mattia De Sciglio completed the comeback. Later in the second half, Matthijs de Ligt was sent off, costing a penalty, and offering Roma the chance to equalise the match, but Lorenzo Pellegrini's penalty was saved by Wojciech Szczęsny.

On 12 January 2022, Juventus played their 17th Supercoppa Italiana against Internazionale, losing 2–1 on extra time. Weston McKennie opened the score in the 25th minute, but Lautaro Martínez put Internazionale on level in the 35th minute by penalty. In the last additional minute in the second half on extra time Alexis Sánchez scored the decisive goal.

On 18 January, Juventus made the debut in Coppa Italia against Sampdoria, starting from Round of 16. The match ended with a 4–1 win to Juventus, which meant that they qualified for the quarter-finals. Juan Cuadrado, Daniele Rugani, Paulo Dybala and Álvaro Morata, on penalty, scored for the home team, while the only goal for Sampdoria was provided by Andrea Conti.

On 28 January, Juventus announced that Serbian forward Dušan Vlahović had been bought from Serie A side Fiorentina. On 31 January, Italian defender Federico Gatti was bought from Serie B side Frosinone. He was sent on loan to the same team until June 2022. Uruguayan midfielder Rodrigo Bentancur was sold to English Premier League side Tottenham Hotspur, along with Swedish midfielder Dejan Kulusevski, but on loan until June 2023 with obligation to buy. Swiss midfielder Denis Zakaria was bought from German Bundesliga side Borussia Mönchengladbach, and Welsh midfielder Aaron Ramsey was sent on loan to Scottish Premiership side Rangers until June 2022 with option to buy.

February 
On 10 February, Juventus faced Sassuolo in the quarter-finals of the Coppa Italia, and won 2–1. Paulo Dybala scored in the third minute, with Hamed Traorè equalizing the score in the 24th minute. An own goal in favour of Juventus late in the second half permitted the home team to qualify for the semi-finals.

On 18 February, Juventus played the Derby della Mole return match against Torino, drawing 1–1. Matthijs de Ligt opened the score in the 13th minute, whose goal was put on level by Andrea Belotti in the 62nd minute.

On 22 February, Juventus restarted their campaign in the Champions League, going against Spanish La Liga side Villarreal in the Round of 16 first leg. The final score was 1–1: Dušan Vlahović put Juventus in front in the first minute, while in the second half Dani Parejo equalised the result.

March 
On 2 March, Juventus went against Fiorentina in the semi-finals first leg of the Coppa Italia: thanks to a Lorenzo Venuti's own goal late in the second half Juventus won 1–0.

On 16 March, Juventus faced Spanish La Liga side Villarreal in the Champions League Round of 16 second leg, losing 3–0. Gerard Moreno, Pau Torres and Arnaut Danjuma secured Villarreal's qualification to the next round. Juventus were then eliminated from the competition with an aggregate score of 4–1.

April 
On 3 April, Juventus played the return match of Derby d'Italia. It resulted in a 1–0 win for Internazionale: Hakan Çalhanoğlu scored on penalty in the additional time of the first half.

On 20 April, Juventus went against Fiorentina in the semi-finals second leg of the Coppa Italia, winning 2–0. Federico Bernardeschi and Danilo secured the qualification to the final with an aggregate score of 3–0.

May 
On 11 May, Juventus played the final of the Coppa Italia in the Derby d'Italia against Internazionale. It ended after extra time, 2–4 in favour of Internazionale. Nicolò Barella opened the score in the seventh minute. In the second half, Alex Sandro in the 50th minute and Dušan Vlahović two minutes later put Juventus in front, before Hakan Çalhanoğlu equalised the score in 80th minute via a penalty. During the extra time, Ivan Perišić scored twice, in the 99th minute and a penalty in the 102nd minute.

On 21 May, Juventus faced Fiorentina for their last match of the season, losing 2–0. Juventus concluded the Serie A in the fourth place which meant they qualified for the 2022–23 UEFA Champions League, starting from the group stage phase.

Players

Squad information
Players, appearances, goals and squad numbers last updated on 16 May 2022. Appearances and goals include league matches only.Note: Flags indicate national team as has been defined under FIFA eligibility rules. Players may hold more than one non-FIFA nationality.

a. Additional costs of €12 million to be paid.

Transfers

Summer 2021

In

Out

Other acquisitions

Other disposals

Winter 2021–22

In

Out

Other acquisitions

Other disposals

Pre-season and friendlies

Competitions

Overview

Serie A

League table

Results summary

Results by round

Matches 
The league fixtures were announced on 14 July 2021.

Coppa Italia

Supercoppa Italiana

UEFA Champions League

Group stage

The draw for the group stage was held on 26 August 2021.

Knockout phase

Round of 16
The draw for the round of 16 was held on 13 December 2021.

Statistics

Appearances and goals

|-
! colspan=14 style=background:#DCDCDC; text-align:center| Goalkeepers

|-
! colspan=14 style=background:#DCDCDC; text-align:center| Defenders

|-
! colspan=14 style=background:#DCDCDC; text-align:center| Midfielders

|-
! colspan=14 style=background:#DCDCDC; text-align:center| Forwards

|-
! colspan="18" style="background:#dcdcdc; text-align:center"| Players transferred during the season

Last updated: 21 May 2022

Goalscorers 

Last updated: 21 May 2022

Notes

See also 
2021–22 Juventus F.C. Under-23 season
2021–22 Juventus F.C. (women) season

References

External links 

 

Juventus F.C. seasons
Juventus
Juventus